Louisiana's 1st State Senate district is one of 39 districts in the Louisiana State Senate. It has been represented by Republican Sharon Hewitt since 2016.

Geography
District 1 is largely based in St. Tammany Parish in Greater New Orleans, stretching south to also include smaller parts of Orleans, Plaquemines, and St. Bernard Parishes. The uninhabited Chandeleur Islands are also located within the district.

The district overlaps with Louisiana's 1st and 2nd congressional districts, and with the 74th, 76th, 90th, 103rd, and 104th districts of the Louisiana House of Representatives.

Recent election results
Louisiana uses a jungle primary system. If no candidate receives 50% in the first round of voting, when all candidates appear on the same ballot regardless of party, the top-two finishers advance to a runoff election.

2019

2015

2011

Federal and statewide results in District 1

References

Louisiana State Senate districts
Orleans Parish, Louisiana
Plaquemines Parish, Louisiana
St. Bernard Parish, Louisiana
St. Tammany Parish, Louisiana